Brühlbach is an often used name of streams in Southern Germany and Switzerland and may refer to:

 Brühlbach (Erms, Bad Urach), left hand tributary of the Erms at the downstream border of city Bad Urach
 Brühlbach (Erms, Metzingen), right hand Erms tributary in Metzingen

See also 
 Brohlbach (disambiguation)
 Buhlbach (disambiguation)